Khalifa Jabbie (born 20 January 1993) is a Sierra Leonean professional footballer who plays as a central midfielder for Iraqi Premier League club Al-Mina'a and the Sierra Leone national team.

Jabbie made his full international debut for Sierra Leone on 17 March 2011, against Niger in a 2012 Africa Cup of Nations qualification game.

Football career
Khalifa Jabbie was born in Freetown, Sierra Leone, to parents from the Mandingo ethnic group. As a youngster, Jabbie was considered one of the top young footballers in Sierra Leone. In 2010, he signed for FC Kallon, one of the top clubs in the Sierra Leone National Premier League, at the age of seventeen. He also captained the Sierra Leone national under-20 team. Jabbie was scouted by popular agent Chernor Musa Jalloh and Swedish Patrick Mork that introduce him to  FFK. He joined Fredrikstad FK in Norway on a three-year contract. Jabbie made his full international debut for Sierra Leone on March 27, 2011, against Niger in a 2012 Africa Cup of Nations qualification played in Niamey. On 19 December 2013, he signed a 2.5 year contract with TFF First League team Balıkesirspor in Turkey.

Career statistics

Club

International

Statistics accurate as of match played 11 October 2014

International goals

References

External links

1993 births
Living people
Sierra Leonean footballers
Sierra Leone international footballers
F.C. Kallon players
Fredrikstad FK players
Balıkesirspor footballers
FC Sheriff Tiraspol players
Eliteserien players
Norwegian First Division players
Sierra Leonean expatriate footballers
Expatriate footballers in Norway
Sierra Leonean expatriate sportspeople in Norway
Expatriate footballers in Turkey
Sierra Leonean expatriate sportspeople in Turkey
TFF First League players
Süper Lig players
Expatriate footballers in Moldova
Sierra Leonean expatriate sportspeople in Moldova
Moldovan Super Liga players
Association football midfielders
Racing Club Beirut players
Lebanese Premier League players
Expatriate footballers in Lebanon
Sierra Leonean expatriate sportspeople in Lebanon
Cheshunt F.C. players
Expatriate footballers in England
Sierra Leonean expatriate sportspeople in England
Al-Mina'a SC players
Expatriate footballers in Iraq